Ernassa is a genus of moths in the family Erebidae. The genus was erected by Francis Walker in 1856.

Species
Ernassa cruenta
Ernassa gabriellae
Ernassa ignata
Ernassa justina
Ernassa sanguinolenta

References

External links

Phaegopterina
Arctiinae of South America
Moth genera